Balassa is a Hungarian surname. Notable people with the surname include:

 Bálint Balassa (1554–1594), Hungarian poet
 Balint Balassi Memorial Sword Award, Hungarian literary award
 Béla Balassa (1928–1991), Hungarian economist
 Balassa-Samuelson effect
 János Balassa (1815–1893), Hungarian surgeon

See also
Bălașa

Hungarian-language surnames